Saint Rusticus of Clermont (or Rustique, Rotiri; died 446) was a Bishop of Clermont in Auvergne.
His feast day is 24 September.

Life

Rusticus was a priest in Clermont when the former bishop, Venerandus, died.
It is said that an assembly of citizens were arguing about candidates to succeed Venerandus when a veiled nun told them to let the Lord make the choice and he would come.
At that moment, Rusticus arrived, and the woman cried out that he was the one appointed by the Lord.
Rusticus succeeded as bishop of Clermont, and was bishop from 424 to 446.
He was succeeded by Saint Namatius, who was bishop from 446 to 462 and founded Clermont Cathedral.

Monks of Ramsgate account

The monks of St Augustine's Abbey, Ramsgate wrote in their Book of Saints (1921),

Butler's account

The hagiographer Alban Butler (1710–1773) wrote in his Lives of the Fathers, Martyrs, and Other Principal Saints under September 24,

Notes

Sources

 

 

Gallo-Roman saints
446 deaths